The second season of The Jack Benny Program consisted of six episodes, during 1951 and 1952.  As with the previous season, this second television season of The Jack Benny Program included only irregularly scheduled special broadcasts, and overlapped with his radio program of the same name which would continue until 1955.  The television program would last until 1965.  The coast to coast coaxial cable had been opened in October, 1951 allowing the program to be broadcast live from Los Angeles.  Prior to the opening of CBS Television City in November, 1952, this season's episodes were broadcast from Columbia Square, from which Benny's radio show was also broadcast.

This season, the program was number nine in the television rankings.  Jack Benny would adopt a more regular schedule with the television program beginning in Season 3.

Episodes

References
 
 

1951 American television seasons
1952 American television seasons
Jack 02